Seetharamu is a 1979 Indian Kannada-language science fiction action film directed by V. Somashekhar. The film stars Shankar Nag, Manjula and Thoogudeepa Srinivas. The film is based on a science fiction plot of a brain transplant. It was remade in Telugu as Seethe Ramudaithe, starring Shankar Nag in his Telugu debut, and in Hindi in 1995 as Diya Aur Toofan.

The song Ee Roopave Nannee Baalina was earlier used by Chellapilla Satyam for the 1978 Telugu movie Annadammula Savaal, which incidentally was a remake of the 1977 Kannada movie Sahodarara Savaal.

Plot

Cast 
 Shankar Nag as Ramu
 Manjula as Seetha
 Thoogudeepa Srinivas
 Kanchana
 Dinesh
 Sundar Krishna Urs as Dr. Dayal
 Shakti Prasad
 Arikesari
 Prabhakar
 B. Jaya

Soundtrack 
The music was composed by Satyam, with lyrics by Chi Udayashankar. The song "Onde Ondu Aasayu" became popular and was remixed in the 2006 film Jackpot.

Reception 
The film was a success and made Shankar Nag popular among the masses.

References

External links 
 

1970s Kannada-language films
1970s science fiction action films
1979 films
Brain transplantation in fiction
Films directed by V. Somashekhar
Films scored by Satyam (composer)
Indian science fiction action films
Kannada films remade in other languages